Sarah Rowe (born 25 July 1995) is a triple code sportswoman who plays association football for Women's National League club Bohemians. She is a former Republic of Ireland women's association football international. In addition to association football, Rowe has also played two other football codes at a senior level. At club level, Rowe has also played association football for Castlebar Celtic, Raheny United and Shelbourne in the Women's National League and for Melbourne Victory in the A-League Women. Rowe was a member of the Republic of Ireland U19 team that won their group at the 2014 UEFA Women's Under-19 Championship and qualified for the semi-finals. In 2016, she was also a member of the Shelbourne Ladies team that won a Women's National League/FAI Women's Cup double.

Early years, family and education
Rowe is from Ballina, County Mayo. She is the daughter of Alan and Grainne Rowe. She has two older sisters, Lorna and Fiona. Her grandfather, Paddy Jordan, was a member of the Mayo squad that won the 1951 All-Ireland Senior Football Championship Final. Her father is involved with Ballina R.F.C., serving as club chairman and club president. He also works for the family business, Rowear, a clothing company specialising in pyjamas. Rowe was educated at The Quay National School and St. Mary's Secondary School. She began playing association football aged seven and Gaelic football aged eight. She credits Hugh Lynn, her school principal at The Quay National School, for encouraging her to develop her sporting potential. Between 2013 and 2018 Rowe attended Dublin City University on a sports scholarship and trained to be a PE and Biology teacher.

Association football

Clubs

St. Mary's Secondary School
In 2010 Rowe was a member of the St. Mary's Secondary School team that won the FAI Under-16 Schoolsgirls Cup. Rowe scored twice in the semi-final as St. Mary's defeated St. Caimin's Community School, Shannon 2–0. In the final Rowe scored the winner as St. Mary's defeated Moville Community College 2–1.

Castlebar Celtic
Rowe played for Castlebar Celtic during the 2012–13 and 2013–14 Women's National League seasons. She was a member of the Celtic team that played in three cup finals, the 2013 and 2014 WNL Cup finals and the 2013 FAI Women's Cup final. On each occasion Celtic finished as runners up. While playing for Celtic, Rowe was also named in the 2012–13 WNL Team of the Year.

Ballina Town
In 2014 Rowe was a member of the Ballina Town team that won the WFAI Intermediate Cup. Rowe provided an assist and scored Ballina's third goal as they defeated Douglas Hall 3–1 in the final at Turners Cross.

Raheny United
Rowe played for Raheny United during the 2014–15 Women's National League season and helped the team win the 2015 WNL Cup.

Shelbourne Ladies
Rowe played for Shelbourne Ladies during the 2015–16 and 2016 Women's National League seasons. She played in the 2015 FAI Women's Cup final but again finished as a runner up. In 2016 she was a member of the Shelbourne Ladies team that won a Women's National League/FAI Women's Cup double.

Melbourne Victory
In January 2023, Rowe signed with A-League Women club Melbourne Victory, initially on a three-week injury replacement contract for in place of Melina Ayres.

Bohemians
In February 2023, Rowe returned to her homeland and signed for Bohemians, in the hope of impressing and being selected by Vera Pauw for the national team.

Republic of Ireland
Rowe represented the Republic of Ireland at under-15, under-17 and under-19  levels. Together with Megan Connolly, Savannah McCarthy, Clare Shine and Katie McCabe, Rowe was a member of the Republic of Ireland U19 team that won their group at the 2014 UEFA Women's Under-19 Championship and qualified for the semi-finals. In the qualification campaign she scored the goal against Turkey that secured their place in the finals. On 4 March 2015, Rowe made her senior debut for the Republic of Ireland at the 2015 Istria Cup. She came on as a substitute against Hungary and subsequently provided an assist for Ruesha Littlejohn who scored to earn the Republic of Ireland a 1–1 draw. Rowe was also a member of the Ireland squad at the 2015 Summer Universiade.

Gaelic football

Clubs
At club level, Rowe has played for Kilmoremoy and DCU GAA. She has played in two 
O'Connor Cup finals for DCU, both against the University of Limerick. In 2015 she finished as a runners up. In 2018 she scored 1–3 as DCU won by 2–12 to 0–17.

Inter-county
She also played for Mayo in the 2017 All-Ireland Senior Ladies' Football Championship Final, losing again to Dublin.

Australian rules football

In August 2018 it was announced that Rowe had signed a five-month, one season contract with Collingwood in the AFLW. On 2 February 2019 Rowe made her AFLW debut for Collingwood in a 24–23 defeat against  at GMHBA Stadium in round 1 of the 2019 season. At the end of the season, Rowe was named Collingwood's Best First Year Player. She signed a contract to play for Collingwood in 2020, though declined a two-season contract so to ensure she could remain available to play for Mayo. Rowe improved her output in most statistical areas and was part of the Magpies team that was narrowly eliminated by North Melbourne in the finals series, shortly before the rest of the season was cancelled outright due to the COVID-19 pandemic. She re-signed with Collingwood again for the 2021 season.

AFLW stats
Statistics are correct at the end of the S7 (2022) season.

|- 
! scope="row" style="text-align:center" | 2019
|style="text-align:center;"|
| 7 || 7 || 2 || 2 || 52 || 21 || 73 || 21 || 20 || 0.3 || 0.3 || 7.4 || 3.0 || 10.4 || 3.0 || 2.9 || 3
|- 
! scope="row" style="text-align:center" | 2020
|style="text-align:center;"|
| 7 || 7 || 5 || 1 || 72 || 31 || 103 || 27 || 17 || 0.7 || 0.1 || 10.3 || 4.4 || 14.7 || 3.9 || 2.4 || 0
|- 
! scope="row" style="text-align:center" | 2021
|style="text-align:center;"|
| 7 || 7 || 1 || 2 || 57 || 37 || 94 || 14 || 6 || 0.1 || 0.3 || 8.1 || 5.3 || 13.4 || 2.0 || 0.9 || 0
|- 
! scope="row" style="text-align:center" | 2022
|style="text-align:center;"|
| 7 || 11 || 1 || 2 || 135 || 50 || 185 || 30 || 23 || 0.1 || 0.2 || 12.3 || 4.5 || 16.8 || 2.7 || 2.1 || 3
|- 
! scope="row" style="text-align:center" | S7 (2022)
|style="text-align:center;"|
| 7 || 11 || 2 || 4 || 82 || 27 || 109 || 18 || 20 || 0.2 || 0.4 || 7.5 || 2.5 || 9.9 || 1.6 || 1.8 || 
|- class="sortbottom"
! colspan=3| Career
! 43
! 11
! 11
! 398
! 166
! 564
! 110
! 86
! 0.3
! 0.3
! 9.3
! 3.9
! 13.1
! 2.6
! 2.0
! 6
|}

Personal life
From 2018 until 2019, Rowe was in a relationship with Seán O'Brien, the retired Ireland rugby union international. This relationship ended because of long distance. She has previously been in a relationship with Aidan O'Shea, who is also a Mayo Gaelic footballer.

Honours

Association football
Shelbourne Ladies
FAI Women's Cup
Winners: 2016: 1
Runners-up: 2015: 1
Women's National League
Winners: 2016
Runners-up: 2015–16
Raheny United
 WNL Cup
Winners: 2015
Ballina Town
 WFAI Intermediate Cup
Winners: 2014
Castlebar Celtic
 FAI Women's Cup
 Runners-up: 2013: 1
 WNL Cup
 Runners-up: 2013, 2014: 2

Gaelic football
Mayo
All-Ireland Senior Ladies' Football Championship
Runner up: 2017
Ladies' National Football League 
Runner up: 2012, 2016, 2018: 3
 DCU GAA
O'Connor Cup 
Winners: 2018: 1
Runner up: 2015: 1

References

External links

1995 births
Living people
Alumni of Dublin City University
Association footballers from County Mayo
People from Ballina, County Mayo
Republic of Ireland women's international footballers
Republic of Ireland women's association footballers
Castlebar Celtic W.F.C. players
Raheny United F.C. players
Shelbourne F.C. (women) players
Melbourne Victory FC (A-League Women) players
Women's National League (Ireland) players
A-League Women players
Women's association football midfielders
Collingwood Football Club (AFLW) players
Irish expatriate sportspeople in Australia
Irish female players of Australian rules football
DCU ladies' Gaelic footballers
Ladies' Gaelic footballers who switched code
Mayo inter-county ladies' footballers
Gaelic footballers' wives and girlfriends
Rugby union players' wives and girlfriends
Republic of Ireland women's youth international footballers